La Plaza is one of thirteen parishes (administrative divisions) in Teverga, a municipality within the province and autonomous community of Asturias, in northern Spain.

The postal code is 33111.

Villages and hamlets
Cansinos 
Entrago (Entragu)
La Favorita
La Obra
Las Garbas
Llamas
Redral
San Martín (Samartín)
Villabonel (Villaunel)
Villar (Vil.lar)

References

Parishes in Teverga